SOFIX is the first official stock market index of the Bulgarian Stock Exchange. Initiated in 2000, the index represents a correlation of the sum of the market capitalization of the companies within the index portfolio on the current day and the sum of the market capitalization of the same on the previous day. In September 2016, the first Bulgarian exchange-traded fund that tracks the performance of SOFIX was launched: Expat Bulgaria SOFIX UCITS ETF.

Index profile

Composition 
As of 19 January 2018, the index is composed of the following companies:

References

External links
 Bloomberg page for SOFIX:IND

European stock market indices